The Moara (also: Mora) is a left tributary of the river Siret in Romania. It flows into the Siret near Mâgla.

References

Rivers of Romania
Rivers of Bacău County